Digitaria cognata is a species of grass known by the common names fall witchgrass, Carolina crabgrass, and mountain hairgrass.

Description
This grass is a perennial without rhizomes. The roots are shallow. The erect stems grow up to 56 centimeters tall. The stem bases are tough and hairy. The leaves are up to 12.6 centimeters long. They are narrow, with "one side wavy, and the other smooth". The inflorescence is a purple-tinged panicle with single-flowered spikelets.

Uses
This grass provides graze for livestock and wild ungulates, and birds eat the seeds.

References

External links
  USDA Plants Profile for Digitaria cognata (fall witchgrass)

cognata
Bunchgrasses of North America
Grasses of Canada
Grasses of the United States
Flora of the Eastern United States
Warm-season grasses of North America